Ligonier is a surname. Notable people with the surname include:

 Edward Ligonier, 1st Earl Ligonier (1740–1782), British soldier and courtier
 Francis Ligonier (1693–1746), French-born British Army officer
 John Ligonier, 1st Earl Ligonier (1680–1770), British military officer